The Danish Poet is a 2006 animated short film written, directed, and animated by Torill Kove and narrated by Liv Ullmann. A co-production of the National Film Board of Canada (NFB) and Mikrofilm AS of Norway, it has won both the Academy Award and Genie Award for best animated short film.

Synopsis
The film follows Kaspar Jørgensen, a Danish poet in the 1940s who is seeking inspiration. At the suggestion of his psychiatrist, Dr. Mørk, he travels to Norway to meet the famous author Sigrid Undset. After arriving in Norway, he meets Ingeborg, a farmer's daughter, and they fall in love. He proposes to her, but discovers that she is already engaged, at her father's wish. She promises not to cut her hair until they are reunited, and Kaspar returns to Denmark.

Later, Ingeborg's husband dies in an accident, and Ingeborg sends a letter to Kaspar. However, it is accidentally dropped by the postman, and never arrives. When Sigrid Undset dies, both Kaspar and Ingeborg travel to the funeral; they are reunited, and later marry and live in Copenhagen. As Kaspar tells Ingeborg that he loves her long hair, she does not cut it, but when Kaspar trips over it and breaks his thumb, she sends for Veslemøy, her hairdresser from Norway. On the way, the hairdresser meets a young man on the train, who was also travelling to Copenhagen to meet Kaspar, his favourite poet. The two fall in love, and are revealed to be the narrator's parents.

Production
Kove first became involved with the National Film Board, an agency of the Government of Canada, after her first year at Concordia University in Montreal. After working there as an assistant for some years, she wrote and pitched a script to the company, which led to her career as a director and animator. She first wrote the script for The Danish Poet some time ago, though she says that she "can’t really remember when".

Production was split between Marcy Page, of the National Film Board, and Lise Fearnley, of Mikrofilm AS in Norway, and took roughly three years, although Kove took a year off for maternity leave.

The film was made using hand-drawn traditional animation, with pencil on paper, and then scanned and digitally coloured, with about half of the animation by Kove, and the rest divided between animators in Montreal and Norway. Kove's style is simplistic, which she says is less a specific style choice than "quite simply [...] the only one I know how to do." The backgrounds were painted by Montreal artist Anne Ashton.

Narrator Liv Ullmann was selected for the film because Kove liked her voice and "thought that her delivery would be right for the story"; she reaffirmed this after the film's release, stating that Ullmann was "just right". She thanked Ullmann in her Academy Award acceptance speech, saying that "it was really amazing of her to participate in this."

Origins
Kove's first ideas for The Danish Poet began when she went through a period of self-assessment; she wanted to write a story about what she described as when "you reach a turning point or a milestone and you look back and you think 'how in the heck did I get here?' [...] And you realize that the answer lies somewhere in a complex web of all kinds of stuff, like genetic make-up, upbringing, coincidences, choices you made along the way, missed opportunities, [and] lucky breaks." She felt that it was a natural choice to centre on a relationship between two people, "because relationships, and especially the romantic ones, play a huge role in shaping our lives, and also, obviously, in creating new ones."

Kove originally wanted to make the film biographical, based on a story her father told her: he had dreamed of being an artist, and made an appointment with an art teacher to ask if he was good enough to make it in the art world. However, he stood at the top of the stairs and decided not to go, eventually deciding to go to architecture school (as his parents wanted) where he met his wife. Kove's inspiration was drawn from the fact that her existence seemed to hinge on that decision, because "if the artist had said, 'Oh, you must paint,' you know, then in all likelihood he would never have met my mother, and, you know, that would have been it for my chances." However, Kove felt the story was too personal, and rewrote it to be fictional.

Themes
The film's main theme shows the effect that coincidence and chance can have on the course of life—like the bad weather, angry dog, hungry goats, slippery planks, and careless postman that change the course of both Kaspar's and Ingeborg's lives—and shows, as the film's website states, that "seemingly unrelated factors might play important roles in the big scheme of things after all." In an interview, Kove said that "what I'm trying to get across is just that I think life is really a kind of a meandering journey ... a lot is really up to chance". Kove has also said that she'd like people to be able to interpret the film in different ways:
I’d like them to walk away thinking it’s a film that can be interpreted in more than one way. I’m happy when I hear from people who’ve seen the short that it makes them think about the kind of strangeness where we find inspiration for art and where we find love, and the kind of miraculousness of just being alive and having a life. I’m pleased when people get that out of it.

She also identifies several subplots of artistic inspiration, as Kaspar "finds [inspiration] within himself", and not within another writer, and a "subtext ... about nationalism and how much emphasis we in the western world put on stereotypes and on which country we're from".

Awards
The Danish Poet received the Academy Award for Animated Short Film at the 79th Academy Awards in 2007, a second Oscar nomination (and first win) for Kove, who was nominated in 2000 for her first professional film, My Grandmother Ironed the King's Shirts, also co-produced by the NFB. The win also marked the first Norwegian film to win an Academy Award since Thor Heyerdahl's Kon-Tiki won for best documentary in 1952.

The Danish Poet also won Best Animated Short at the 27th Genie Awards in 2007, and a Norwegian-language picture book adaptation was nominated for the 2007 Brage Prize. It was also included in the 2006 Animation Show of Shows.

References

External links
The Danish Poet, National Film Board of Canada
The Danish Poet at the Norwegian Film Institute
The Danish Poet at the YouTube Screening Room

2006 animated films
2006 films
2006 short films
2000s animated short films
Best Animated Short Academy Award winners
Canadian animated short films
Films directed by Torill Kove
Films set in Norway
Films set in Copenhagen
Best Animated Short Film Genie and Canadian Screen Award winners
National Film Board of Canada animated short films
Norwegian animated short films
Norwegian short films
2000s English-language films
2000s Canadian films